Summer Set or Summerset may refer to:

Music:
"Summer Set", a 1960 single by Mr. Acker Bilk and His Paramount Jazz Band
The Summer Set, American pop-punk band

Places in the United States:
Summer Set, Missouri
Summerset, South Dakota